Birrel Josef Mendelson (July 30, 1944 – February 7, 2023), known as Mendelson Joe, was a Canadian singer-songwriter, guitarist, painter, and political activist, who was known for using his art to express political themes. Born and raised in Toronto, Ontario and then moving to Maple, Ontario at age 13.

Joe was the nephew of Ruth Eisenberg, "Ivory" of Ebony and Ivory. He died by assisted suicide on February 7, 2023, at the age of 78.

Music Career
He began performing as a blues musician under the name Joe Mendelson in 1964. Four years later, he joined with guitarist Mike McKenna to form the band McKenna Mendelson Mainline. Despite achieving some success, he was dissatisfied with being in the group, and left in 1972 to pursue a solo career. The group reformed briefly in 1975. 

In 1975, after releasing two albums as "Joe Mendelson", he adopted his current name, "Mendelson Joe". On his earlier albums, he worked closely with other artists as co-producers, including former McKenna Mendelson Mainline bandmate Edward "Ted" William Purdy and Colin Linden. His later works were mostly self-produced. Likewise, his early albums mostly appeared on a series of independent labels (including Taurus Records, Boot Records, and Anthem Records), but his later self-produced albums were released independently. In total, Joe recorded more than 30 solo albums, although only about half were officially released.  

In 1988, he appeared in an episode of Sharon, Lois & Bram's Elephant Show titled "Sunday in the Park". Around this period, a music video for a novelty song he recorded, "Dance with Joe", received extensive airplay on MuchMusic.

Painting Career
First putting brush to canvas in 1975, Joe would also make a name for himself as a contemporary artist, pursuing painting, often portraits of famous Canadians. In 1980, he had a show of his work at the Canadian Cultural Centre, Paris in which his art style was described as "Dauntless Evidentiam". In 1985, he had a show of 25 portraits at the Robert McLaughlin Gallery in Oshawa titled "Working Women", curated by Joan Murray. His most famous painting depicted Prime Minister Brian Mulroney with his face superimposed on a pair of human buttocks. He published a book of his portraits, Joe's Toronto, in 2005.

Joe appeared in Derek May's 1981 documentary film on the Toronto art scene, Off the Wall.

Discography

McKenna Mendelson Mainline
 McKenna Mendelson Blues (Paragon, 1969) bootlegged demo tape
 Stink (Liberty Records, 1969)
 Canada - Our Home and Native Land (GRT Records, 1971)
 The Bump 'n' Grind Review (GRT Records, 1972)
 Mainline: No Substitute - The Grand Reunion of Mainline (Taurus Records, 1975)

Solo
 Mr. Middle Of The Road (Nobody Records, distributed by GRT Records, 1972) as Joe Mendelson 
 Sophisto (Taurus Records, 1979) as Joe Mendelson 
 Not Homogenized (Boot Records, 1979)
 Jack Frost (Boot Records, 1980)
 Let's Party (Boot Records, 1981)
 Not Safe (1982) *
 The Name of The Game Ain't Schmaltz: Some of the Best of Mendelson Joe (Stony Plain Records, 1984)
 Fragile Man (Health Records, 1986) *
 Born To Cuddle (Anthem Records, 1988) recorded with the Shuffle Demons
 Addicted (Anthem Records, 1991)
 Women Are the Only Hope (1992) *
 Humans Bug Me (1997) *
 Spoiled Bratland (1998) *
 Everybody Needs a Pimp (1999) *
 Humans (Old Bold Records, 1999) *
 Live * At Sixty-Five (Old Bold Records, 2010) *
 Buried Treasure (2014) *

* Independently released

References

External links
 Mendelson Joe
 
 
 Article at thecanadianencyclopedia.ca

1944 births
2023 deaths
2023 suicides
20th-century Canadian painters
Canadian male painters
21st-century Canadian painters
Artists from Toronto
Canadian blues singers
Canadian blues guitarists
Canadian male guitarists
Jewish Canadian musicians
Canadian humanists
Canadian male singers
Canadian singer-songwriters
Musicians from Toronto
Anthem Records artists
Canadian male singer-songwriters
20th-century Canadian male artists
21st-century Canadian male artists